Hessian Barracks, formerly known as Frederick Barracks, is an historic barracks building located in Frederick, Maryland. The State of Maryland contracted to build a barracks in the summer of 1777, but it was not completed until 1781. There were two L-shaped buildings built on the site, but one was demolished in 1871. The building is a two-story stone structure with gallery porches and a gable roof. Hessian Barracks was listed on the National Register of Historic Places in 1971.

History 
During the American Revolutionary War (1775–1783), the buildings and grounds were used to house British and German prisoners of war. The barracks were put to a variety of uses during the 19th century including a state armory, silkworm production site, and military hospital after the nearby Battle of South Mountain and subsequent Battle of Antietam in September 1862. The parade field served as the Agricultural Fairgrounds from 1853 to 1860. In 1867, it was chosen as the site for the Maryland Institution for the Deaf and Dumb (present-day Maryland School for the Deaf). The western barracks building was demolished in 1871 for the construction of a new Victorian style large central school building, which in turn was razed in the late 1960s, and replaced by individual brick cottages.

See also  
 National Register of Historic Places listings in Frederick County, Maryland

References

Further reading

External links 

 
 Hessian Barracks at Historical Marker Database
  at Maryland Historical Trust
 

1777 establishments in Maryland
American Civil War hospitals
American Revolution on the National Register of Historic Places
American Revolutionary War sites
Barracks on the National Register of Historic Places
Buildings and structures in Frederick County, Maryland
Defunct hospitals in Maryland
Defunct prisons in Maryland
Former military buildings and structures
Former school buildings in the United States
Government buildings completed in 1781
Historic American Buildings Survey in Maryland
Maryland in the American Civil War
Maryland in the American Revolution
Maryland in the War of 1812
Military facilities on the National Register of Historic Places in Maryland
National Register of Historic Places in Frederick County, Maryland
Prisoner of war camps in the United States
Protected areas established in 1971
Protected areas of Frederick County, Maryland
Quasi-War